Kymore is an industrial town and a nagar panchayat in Vijayraghavgarh tehsil in Katni district in the Indian state of Madhya Pradesh. Known mainly for its cement works established in 1921 by J. K. Fisher.

The famous Murlidhar temple was established in 1930.

Economy
Limestone mining employs most of the local population. After independence, the cement works were owned by The Associated Cement Companies Limited. As of 2011, 2.2 million tonnes of cement is produced here yearly.

Many old quarries were abandoned due to depletion or inadequate technology and were converted into water reservoirs. As of 2011, limestone comes from nearby Mahegaon mines, which is about 11 km away. India's second-longest conveyor belt was built here to fetch limestone from these mines.

Other industries include bauxite and marble mines and an asbestos sheet manufacturing facility, established in 1934 by the UK's Turner & Newall group of UK, now operated by Everest Industries Ltd.

Geography
Kymore hills run along from north to west of the entire town.

Temples and festivals
Dussehra is the biggest annual event. People visit during this time to witness the event. Murlidhar temple is a temple in the center of Kymore.

Demographics 
As of 2001 India census, Kymore had a population of 35,300. Males constitute 53% of the population and females 47%. Kymore had an average literacy rate of 70.3%, higher than the national average of 59.5%. Male literacy was 78% and female literacy was 61%. 13% of the population is under 6.

Education
Schools include DAV ACC Public School (CBSE Affiliated), Kymore Higher Secondary School Kymore & ACC Higher Secondary School. Shramdham Higher secondary School.

Sports 
ACC Gymkhana club offers recreation. An annual district level cricket tournament celebrates the memory of Shri R. K. Sharma, gathering 60-70 teams. The tournament includes other sports such as football, volleyball, badminton, table tennis, kabbaddi, and athletics.

Transport 
The nearest railway stations are Jukehi 22 km, Katni 45 km on Itarsi Allahabad rail line and Katni Murwara 45 km on Katni Bina rail line.  The airports are in Jabalpur and Khajuraho. Buses from Kymore to Vijayraghavgarh(8 km) to Katni (45 km), Maihar (40 km), Jabalpur (135 km), Rewa (140 km) and Satna (85 km) are available on 5:45 A.M. at morning daily service.

References

Cities and towns in Katni district
Katni